Mexico competed at the 1988 Summer Olympics in Seoul, South Korea. 83 competitors, 66 men and 17 women, took part in 82 events in 17 sports.

Competitors
The following is the list of number of competitors in the Games.

Medalists

Archery

In its third Olympic archery competition, Mexico entered three men and one woman.  Aurora Breton, a veteran of Mexico's first two appearances, fell to 29th place.

Women's Individual Competition:
 Aurora Bretón – Preliminary round (→ 29th place)

Men's Individual Competition:
 Jose Anchondo – Preliminary round (→ 26th place)
 Omar Bustani – Preliminary round (→ 38th place)
 Adolfo González – Preliminary round (→ 49th place)

Men's Team Competition:
 Anchondo, Bustani, and Gonzalez – Semifinal (→ 12th place)

Athletics

Men's 100 metres
Eduardo Nava

Men's 800 metres
Mauricio Hernández

Men's 5,000 metres
 Mauricio González
 Marcos Barreto
 Arturo Barrios

Men's 10,000 metres 
 Arturo Barrios
 First Round — 28:08.63
 Final — 27:39.32 (→ 5th place)

 Mauricio González
 First Round — 28:36.66
 Final — 27:59.90 (→ 11th place)

 Marcos Barreto
 Heat – 29:18.14 (→ did not advance)

Men's Marathon 
 Jesús Herrera
 Final — 2"13:58 (→ 11th place)

 Carlos Retiz
 Final — 2"25:34 (→ 50th place)

 Martín Mondragón
 Final — 2"27:10 (→ 57th place)

Men's 110 metres Hurdles
Roberto Carmona

Men's 4×100 metres Relay
Herman Adam, Eduardo Nava, Antonio Ruíz, and Miguel Elizondo

Men's 20 km Walk
 Carlos Mercenario
 Final — 1:20:53 (→ 7th place)

 Ernesto Canto
 Final — DSQ (→ no ranking)

 Joel Sánchez
 Final — DSQ (→ no ranking)

Men's 50 km Walk
 Martín Bermudez
 Final — 3'49:22 (→ 15th place)

 Arturo Bravo
 Final — 4'08:08 (→ 33rd place)

 Hernán Andrade
 Final — DSQ (→ no ranking)

Women's Marathon
 Blanca Jaime
 Final — 2:43:00 (→ 43rd place)

Women's 100 metres Hurdles
Sandra Taváres

Women's High Jump
Cristina Fink
 Qualification — 1.84 m (→ did not advance)

Boxing

Men's Flyweight
Mario González

Men's Bantamweight
José de Jesús García

Men's Featherweight
Miguel Angel González

Men's Lightweight
Guillermo Tamez

Men's Light-Welterweight
Humberto Rodríguez

Men's Middleweight
Martín Amarillas

Cycling

Five cyclists, all men, represented Mexico in 1988.

Men's road race
 Luis Rosendo Ramos
 Héctor Pérez
 Gabriel Cano

Men's team time trial
 Gabriel Cano
 Guillermo Gutiérrez
 Héctor Pérez
 Luis Rosendo Ramos

Men's points race
 Manuel Youshimatz

Diving

Equestrianism

Fencing

One female fencer represented Mexico in 1988.

Women's foil
 Fabiana López

Gymnastics

Judo

Modern pentathlon

Three male pentathletes represented Mexico in 1988.

Men's Individual Competition:
 Ivar Sisniega – 5065 pts (→ 14th place)
 Alejandro Yrizar – 4920 pts (→ 28th place)
 Marcelo Hoyo – 4800 pts (→ 39th place)

Men's Team Competition:
 Sisniega, Yrizar, and Hoyo – 14785 pts (→ 8th place)

Rowing

Sailing

Shooting

Swimming

Men's 50 m Freestyle
 Rodrigo González
 Heat – 24.01 (→ did not advance, 29th place)

 Urbano Zea
 Heat – 24.86 (→ did not advance, 45th place)

Men's 100 m Freestyle
 Rodrigo González
 Heat – 51.46 (→ did not advance, 28th place)

 Ignacio Escamilla
 Heat – 54.56 (→ did not advance, 56th place)

Men's 200 m Freestyle
 Rodrigo González
 Heat – 1:52.99 (→ did not advance, 26th place)

 Ignacio Escamilla
 Heat – 1:53.63 (→ did not advance, 32nd place)

Men's 400 m Freestyle
 Ignacio Escamilla
 Heat – 4:03.16 (→ did not advance, 34th place)

 Carlos Romo
 Heat – 4:04.02 (→ did not advance, 35th place)

Men's 100 m Backstroke
 Ernesto Vela
 Heat – 59.19 (→ did not advance, 33rd place)

Men's 200 m Backstroke
 Ernesto Vela
 Heat – 2:05.08 (→ did not advance, 22nd place)

Men's 100 m Breaststroke
 Javier Careaga
 Heat – 1:05.37 (→ did not advance, 35th place)

Men's 200 m Breaststroke
 Javier Careaga
 Heat – 2:20.11 (→ did not advance, 23rd place)

Men's 100 m Butterfly
 Urbano Zea
 Heat – 57.89 (→ did not advance, 40th place)

 Carlos Romo
 Heat – 58.04 (→ did not advance, 41st place)

Men's 200 m Individual Medley
 Javier Careaga
 Heat – 2:09.38 (→ did not advance, 24th place)

 Rodrigo González
 Heat – 2:09.52 (→ did not advance, 25th place)

Men's 400 m Individual Medley
 Javier Careaga
 Heat – 4:30.71 (→ did not advance, 21st place)

Men's 4 × 100 m Freestyle Relay
 Rodrigo González, Ignacio Escamilla, Jorge Alarcón, and Urbano Zea
 Heat – 3:29.72 (→ did not advance, 13th place)

Men's 4 × 200 m Freestyle Relay
 Ignacio Escamilla, Jorge Alarcón, Carlos Romo, and Rodrigo González
 Heat – DSQ (→ did not advance, no ranking)

Men's 4 × 100 m Medley Relay
 Ernesto Vela, Javier Careaga, Urbano Zea, and Rodrigo González
 Heat – 3:54.21 (→ did not advance, 20th place)

Women's 50 m Freestyle
 Maria Rivera
 Heat – 27.16 (→ did not advance, 26th place)

 Patricia Kohlmann
 Heat – 27.45 (→ did not advance, 32nd place)

Women's 100 m Freestyle
 Patricia Kohlmann
 Heat – 59.05 (→ did not advance, 36th place)

 Maria Rivera
 Heat – 59.32 (→ did not advance, 38th place)

Women's 200 m Freestyle
 Patricia Kohlmann
 Heat – 2:10.36 (→ did not advance, 35th place)

Women's 100 m Butterfly
 Marlene Bruten
 Heat – 1:05.37 (→ did not advance, 29th place)

Women's 200 m Butterfly
 Marlene Bruten
 Heat – 2:19.68 (→ did not advance, 23rd place)

Women's 200 m Individual Medley
 Marlene Bruten
 Heat – 2:26.89 (→ did not advance, 27th place)

 Patricia Kohlmann
 Heat – 2:29.61 (→ did not advance, 29th place)

Women's 400 m Individual Medley
 Marlene Bruten
 Heat – 5:03.69 (→ did not advance, 26th place)

Synchronized swimming

Three synchronized swimmers represented Mexico in 1988.

Women's solo
 Lourdes Candini
 Susana Candini
 Sonia Cárdeñas

Women's duet
 Lourdes Candini
 Sonia Cárdeñas

Tennis

Men's Singles Competition
 Agustín Moreno
 First round — Defeated Toshihisa Tsuchihashi (Japan) 7-6, 6-2, 6-4
 Second round — Lost to Stefan Edberg (Sweden) 2-6, 6-7, 0-6

 Francisco Maciel
 First round — Lost to Diego Nargiso (Italy) 6-2, 6-7, 6-7, 6-8

 Leonardo Lavalle
 First round — Defeated Ronald Agénor (Haiti) 3-6, 6-3, 6-2, 2-1, retired
 Second round — Lost to Sergio Casal (Spain) 3-6, 4-6, 6-7

Women's Singles Competition
Xochitl Escobedo
 First Round – Lost to Anne Minter (Australia) 1-6, 3-6

Claudia Hernández
 First Round – Bye
 Second Round – Lost to Zina Garrison (USA) 1-6, 4-6

Wrestling

Men's Greco-Roman Bantamweight
Adrian Ponce

Men's Freestyle Flyweight
Bernardo Olvera

Men's Freestyle Bantamweight
Jorge Olvera

Men's Freestyle Welterweight
Alfonso Jessel

References

Nations at the 1988 Summer Olympics
1988
Olympics